Black Tusk may refer to:

Black Tusk (band), an American heavy metal band
Black Tusk Studios, a Canadian video game development studio
The Black Tusk, a mountain in British Columbia, Canada